Roland Ries (born 11 January 1945) is a French politician from Alsace holding several posts on local, regional and national level since 1997.

A member of the Socialist Party and mayor of Strasbourg between 2008 and 2020 Ries also serves as the first President of the Strasbourg-Ortenau Eurodistrict's Council since 2010. Ries had already been the mayor of Strasbourg (and the President of the Urban Community of Strasbourg) between June 1997 and January 2000, filling in for Catherine Trautmann (whose deputy he had been since 1989) after she had become Minister of Culture and Communication in the government of Lionel Jospin.

Ries has furthermore been a Member of the Senate of France for the Bas-Rhin department between September and November 2004 and is again a Member since February 2005. Since 24 September 2008, Roland Ries is the president of the Association TGV Est-Européen. and was elected a member of the board of directors of the SNCF for a period of five years starting on 8 March 2013. Additionally, he served as the chairman of the Groupement des autorités responsables de transport (GART) from September 2008 until September 2014 and was elected president of the network of French cities Cités unies France in July 2014, for a duration of two years.

Political career

Member of the French Economic and Social Council : 2001-2003.

Electoral mandates

Senate of France

Senator of Bas-Rhin : Since 2004. Elected in 2004.

Regional council

Regional councillor of Alsace : 1996-2004 (Resignation). Reelected in 1998, 2004.

Urban Community council

President of the Urban Community of Strasbourg : 1997-2001.

1st vice-président of the Urban Community of Strasbourg : Since 2008.

Vice-président of the Urban Community of Strasbourg : 1989-1997. Reelected in 1995.

Member of the Urban Community of Strasbourg : Since 1989. Reelected in 1995, 2001, 2008.

Municipal council

Mayor of Strasbourg : 1997-2000 / Since 2008. Reelected in 2008, 2014.

1st deputy-mayor of Strasbourg : 1989-1997. Reelected in 1995.

Municipal councillor of Strasbourg : Since 1983. Reelected in 1989, 1995, 2001, 2008.

Eurodistrict council

President of the Strasbourg-Ortenau Eurodistrict : since 2010

References

1945 births
Living people
People from Bas-Rhin
Politicians from Grand Est
Unified Socialist Party (France) politicians
Socialist Party (France) politicians
French Senators of the Fifth Republic
Senators of Bas-Rhin
Mayors of Strasbourg
University of Strasbourg alumni
French people of German descent